Carex loliacea is a species of flowering plant belonging to the family Cyperaceae.

Its native range is Northern and Eastern Central Europe to Japan, Subarctic America to Canada.

References

loliacea